Silwad is a Palestinian town located  north-east of Ramallah, about 5 km away from the Nablus-Jerusalem highway. Silwad's altitude is about 851 meters above sea level. According to the Palestinian Central Bureau of Statistics (PCBS), the town had a population of 6,123 inhabitants in 2007.

Etymology
Historians have argued the etymology of Silwad's name. Some debated that it is derived from the words lisan and wad, meaning  "tongue of the valley," as the town is surrounded by mountains from all sides, while the town appears as a tongue amidst the mountains. Others claim that "Silwad" comes from the words sal and wad, meaning  "a running valley."

Climate 
The climate is Mediterranean-mountainous. Silwad experiences cold and humid winters with several days of snow almost every year with an average annual precipitation of about 750 millimeters (29.5 inches). The summers are dry and mild. This climate is suitable for growing cherries, nectarines, kiwifruit, peaches, grapes and olives.

Location
It is bordered by Deir Jarir and Et Taiyiba to the east, Al Mazra'a ash Sharqiya and Jaljiliya to the north, Yabrud, Atara and Ein Siniya to the west and Ein Yabrud to the south.

History
Silwad was inhabited in the Mamluk era.

Ottoman era
Silwad was inhabited in the  early Ottoman era. In the spring of 1697, Henry Maundrell noted two "Arab villages," first  "Geeb" and then "Selwid," both on the west side of the road on the way south from Nablus to Jerusalem. Edward Robinson identified these two villages as Jibiya and Silwad.

In 1838, Selwad was noted as a Muslim village in the District of Beni Murrah, north of Jerusalem.

An Ottoman village list of about 1870 counted 205 houses and a population of  817 in Silwad, though the population count included men, only.

In 1882,  the PEF's Survey of Western Palestine described it as being situated on a hill, and having ancient tombs and a fine spring.

In 1896 the population of Silwad was estimated to be about 1,845 persons.

British Mandate era
In the 1922 census of Palestine conducted by the British Mandate authorities, Silwad had a population of 1,344, all Muslim, increasing in the 1931 census to 1631 Muslims and 4 Christians, in a total of 380 houses.

In  the 1945 statistics  the population was 1,910 Muslims,  while the total land area was 14,186 dunams, according to an official land and population survey. Of this, 12,909  were plantations and irrigable land, 2,496 for cereals, while 72 dunams were classified as built-up areas.

Jordanian era
In the wake of the 1948 Arab–Israeli War, and after the 1949 Armistice Agreements, Silwad came  under Jordanian rule.

Jordan confiscated lands of Silwad and nearby Ein Yabrud for the construction of a military camp before the Six-Day War.

The Jordanian census of 1961 found 3,215 inhabitants.

1967-present
Since the Six-Day War in 1967, Silwad has been under Israeli occupation. Only 1.7% of village land belongs to Area A in the Oslo II Accord, while 37.7%  is defined as Area B,  and  the remaining 60.6% is Area C.

The economy of Silwad is based on farming as well as handicrafts.

Land confiscation
The Jordanian buildings formed the initial basis of the Israeli settlement of Ofra founded in 1975. Plans for further expansion of Ofra in this land in 2011 resulted in legal challenges and public dispute. According to ARIJ, Israel has confiscated 988 dunams of land from Silwad for the construction of  Ofra.

Silwad villagers have petitioned the High Court to be allowed to farm their traditional lands to which they had been denied access for a decade. They requested the right to access to some 3,100 dunams, a quarter of Silwad's lands of which has been blocked by settlers. Land that has been blocked from cultivation in this way includes property of villagers from Taybeh, Ein Yabrud and Deir Jarir. The IDF blocked Silwad villagers from accessing their farming lands when under escort from peace activists; these lands cannot be entered directly from the village itself but only via the Israeli settlement of Ofra. The incident occurred after they had obtained permission to enter it, under escort from volunteers of Yesh Din.

3 March 2002 incident

A 22-year-old Silwad bricklayer, Thaer Hamad, according to a local report, used his grandfather's WW2 Jordanian army bolt action Mauser and 30 rounds to fire from a nearby hill, at Wadi Haramiya on an Israeli checkpoint, near the settlements of Ofra and Shilo,  killing 7 soldiers and three civilian settlers. He let one settler woman and her two children pass unharmed. He told one person of his deed, word leaked out and he was eventually arrested in October 2004, put on trial and sentenced to 11 life sentences. Thaer had seen one of his uncle's (Nabil Hammad), killed when he was a child, during the First Intifada, and another shot dead by Israeli forces during the Al-Aqsa Intifada.  Robi Danelin, the mother of one of the dead soldiers, who said her son had served reluctantly in the West Bank, wrote a letter of reconciliation to Hamad's family. Her letter was rebuffed by Thaer, who brusquely dismissed what he described as an equation between casualties among soldiers in an army of occupation and martyrs killed in the course of their struggle for freedom. The episode formed the basis for the plot of Najwa Najjar's 2014 film, Eyes of a Thief.

24 October 2014 incident
Orwa Abd al-Wahhab Hammad (14/17), a US citizen who came from New Orleans to the West Bank when he was 6, and was a cousin of Thaer Hamad, was shot dead with a bullet to the neck which exited from his head during a demonstration in the village, reportedly by an Israeli sniper. He was the second such teenager killed by IDF live fire in the West Bank in 8 days, the 10th since the beginning of 2014, adding to the total of 34 Palestinian victims of IDF gunfire at civilians in the West Bank since mid-June. In various reports IDF sources state he was shot when he threw a bomb, or that an adult was shot when he lit a molotov cocktail fuse and was readying himself to throw it on Route 60. His cousin said he was among a group of rock-throwing Palestinians.

Demographics

According to the estimates of Silwad Association in Jordan the population of the people of Silwad in Diaspora exceeds 25,000 (1996 estimates). Among these, 8,000 reside in Silwad. There are about 8,000 Palestinians from Silwad in Kuwait, and there are also some in North and South America, especially Brazil.

Notable people from Silwad
Mufid Abdulqader, an activist with the Holy Land Foundation
Qadura Fares, Political leader of Fatah
Khaled Mashal, leader of Hamas

References

Bibliography

External links
Welcome to the City of Silwad
Silwad, Welcome to Palestine
Survey of Western Palestine, Map 14:  IAA, Wikimedia commons 
Silwad town (including Silwad camp) (fact sheet),  Applied Research Institute–Jerusalem (ARIJ)
 Silwad town profile (including Silwad camp), ARIJ
Silwad aerial photo, ARIJ
Silwad camp aerial photo, ARIJ
Silwad.com
 Deir Jarir & Silwad: Two Palestinian villages Hammered by the Israeli Occupation 15, March, 2008, POICA

Towns in the West Bank
Ramallah and al-Bireh Governorate
Municipalities of the State of Palestine